William Jesse Winn, Jr. (born April 15, 1989) is a former American football defensive end. He played college football at Boise State. He was considered one of the best defensive tackle prospects for the 2012 NFL Draft and was drafted in the sixth round by the Cleveland Browns. He has also played for the Indianapolis Colts.

High school career
Winn attended Las Vegas High School, graduating in 2007.

College career
Winn attended Boise State University from 2007 to 2011. Where he recorded 133 tackles and 16 sacks.

Professional career

Cleveland Browns
Winn was selected by the Cleveland Browns in the sixth round with the 205th overall pick of the 2012 NFL Draft

Winn had a strong rookie season with 26 tackles, one sack, and one interception.

Indianapolis Colts
On September 11, 2015, Winn was traded to the Indianapolis Colts for a conditional 2017 draft pick. He was placed on season-ending injured reserve on December 21.

Denver Broncos
On July 31, 2016, Winn signed with the Denver Broncos. His free agent contract is for one-year and $760,000.

On May 3, 2017, Winn re-signed with the Broncos. He suffered a torn ACL in the Broncos first preseason game and was ruled out for the season.

On April 22, 2019, Winn re-signed with the Denver Broncos. He was placed on injured reserve on August 4, 2019 with a triceps injury. On March 5, 2020, Winn was released by the Broncos.

Green Bay Packers
On September 16, 2020, Winn was signed the Green Bay Packers' practice squad. He was elevated to the active roster on September 26 for the team's week 3 game against the New Orleans Saints, and reverted to the practice squad after the game. He was elevated again on October 5 for the week 4 game against the Atlanta Falcons, and reverted to the practice squad again following the game. He was promoted to the active roster on October 24. He was placed on injured reserve on December 9, 2020.

NFL career statistics

Regular season

References

External links

Green Bay Packers bio

1989 births
Living people
American football defensive ends
American football defensive tackles
Boise State Broncos football players
Cleveland Browns players
Denver Broncos players
Green Bay Packers players
Indianapolis Colts players
Players of American football from Nevada
Sportspeople from Las Vegas
Las Vegas High School alumni